The 2022 Rivne missile strikes is a series of missile strikes carried out by Russian troops on the city of Rivne and the Rivne Oblast during the 2022 Russian invasion of Ukraine.

Timeline

February 
On February 25, a rocket attack was reported on the Rivne airport.

March 
On March 14, Russian troops carried out two airstrikes against the Rivne TV Tower, as a result of which 21 people were killed and 9 were injured. Rockets hit the television tower and administrative buildings nearby. On March 16, an airstrike happened on Sarny, Rivne region, there were no victims. 

On March 21, two rockets hit a training ground in the Rivne region On March 26, an oil depot in Dubno was shelled. On March 28, there was an explosion on an oil depot in Klevan.

April 
On April 25, three missiles hit the railway infrastructure of the Rivne region. As a result, 20 private houses were destroyed or damaged. One man was also injured in the shelling.

May 
In the afternoon of May 21, the Russian military launched a missile attack on military targets in the Rivne region, there were no casualties.

June 
On June 25, a rocket attack was carried out on civilian infrastructure in the city of Sarny, at least four people were killed and seven others were injured.

August 
On the evening of August 28, in Sarny, several explosions were reported during an air raid, the city was hit by a rocket attack from the Russian Armed Forces for the third time. According to the head of the Rivne Regional State Administration, V. Koval, a total of four missile strikes on military infrastructure were recorded. There were no casualties. About 30 residential buildings and the premises of the central district hospital were damaged by the shock wave.

October 
On October 10, the head of the Rivne Oblast, Vitaly Koval, informed that two missiles and one drone were shot down over the region. On the evening of October 12, a Russian target was shot down during an air alert in the north of the Rivne region. Vitaliy Koval did not specify whether it was a missile or a drone. On the morning of October 22, 2022, Russian troops launched a missile attack on energy infrastructure, as a result of the attack, electric substations were damaged. There were no casualties. The enterprise Rivneazot had an emergency shutdown due to shelling.

November 
In the evening of November 15, Russian troops launched a missile attack on a critical infrastructure object, according to preliminary information, there were no casualties.

References 

Airstrikes during the 2022 Russian invasion of Ukraine
Attacks on buildings and structures in 2022
February 2022 events in Ukraine
March 2022 events in Ukraine
April 2022 events in Ukraine
May 2022 events in Ukraine
June 2022 events in Ukraine
August 2022 events in Ukraine
October 2022 events in Ukraine
Airstrikes conducted by Russia
Attacks on buildings and structures in Ukraine
Rivne
History of Rivne Oblast